Hans Gstöttner (born 2 December 1967) is a German wrestler. He competed at the 1988 Summer Olympics and the 1992 Summer Olympics.

References

External links
 

1967 births
Living people
German male sport wrestlers
Olympic wrestlers of East Germany
Olympic wrestlers of Germany
Wrestlers at the 1988 Summer Olympics
Wrestlers at the 1992 Summer Olympics
Sportspeople from Halle (Saale)
21st-century German people
20th-century German people